Toftrees is a census-designated place in Patton Township, Centre County, Pennsylvania, United States. The hilltop community surrounds the Toftrees Golf Resort. As of the 2010 census, the population of the community was 2,053.

References

Census-designated places in Centre County, Pennsylvania
Census-designated places in Pennsylvania